Lewis Burwell may refer to:
 The Burwell Family of Virginia named four of its prominent members Lewis Burwell, in the 17th and 18th century
 Lewis Burwell (Upper Canada), left the nascent USA and fought against the US, with his brother Mahlon Burwell